WOAM (1350 AM) is a Peoria, Illinois radio station that broadcasts an adult standards/MOR format.

History
The station signed on as WEEK April 27, 1947.  Peoria's TV channel 25 was started by the owners of 1350, and to this day channel 25 retains the callsign WEEK-TV, but 1350 itself has since switched callsigns several times.

Other call letters have included WAAP, WXCL (still retained by a former sister station), and WTAZ.

The station was most successful as WXCL with a country music format adopted in 1965.  Eventually WXCL was simulcast on 104.9, a Pekin, Illinois station that changed its callsign to WXCL-FM.

Personalities when the station was country music station WXCL included Don Elliot, Lee Ranson, Chuck Urban, Bill Bro, Paul Jackson, (Part Timer Arlen Horn), and Jim Crowley, Steve Young, Doug Adams, Tweed Scott, and Dave Hinkley.

Bob Kelly bought the station in 1986.

In 1994 the simulcast was dropped, with WXCL-FM 104.9 keeping the callsign and country format, and 1350 becoming WOAM with the Music of Your Life format.  Veteran Peoria native/broadcaster Cliff Shell hosted a highly rated morning drive show for its first two years.  WOAM also became the highest rated AM station in Peoria during its second year on the air.  In 1999 the station flipped to talk as (then) sister station WTAZ in Morton, Illinois) was moved from 102.3 FM to 1350 AM.  In September 2001 the WTAZ call letters and format were dropped and WOAM returned using the Timeless Classics syndicated adult standards format.  In 2007 WOAM switched to Dial Global's Adult Standards syndicated format.  By the time WOAM first went dark, its only local show was morning show Breakfast with Royce and Roger.

On October 2, 2008, WOAM, along with sister station 94.3 WPMJ Chillicothe, Illinois, went dark.  Company owner Bob Kelly said he was still seeking funding and expects the stations to be off the air for "probably" 6 to 12 months, but that he did not intend to declare bankruptcy.  WOAM resumed operations in September 2009, but was approved to go silent again in January 2010.

After briefly returning to the air in early 2011 with automated broadcasts, it was purchased by Nelson Broadcasting, Inc.  With the transfer of ownership, WOAM returned to the air in late July 2011, with the morning Breakfast with Royce and Roger returning in early August 2011.  Staffing cuts ended Breakfast with Royce and Roger again at the end of September 2012.

WOAM's license was assigned to American Education Foundation, Inc. effective January 1, 2013, for no consideration.

References

External links

FCC History Cards for WOAM

OAM
Adult standards radio stations in the United States
Radio stations established in 1947